The 1904 Georgia Tech football team represented the Georgia Institute of Technology during the 1904 Southern Intercollegiate Athletic Association football season. This is the first year for Georgia Tech under coach John Heisman. Lob Brown was the school's first consensus All-Southern player.

Schedule

References

Georgia Tech
Georgia Tech Yellow Jackets football seasons
Georgia Tech football